Mohamed Kharbouch (born 22 January 1977) is a Moroccan former professional footballer who played as a defender. He made one appearance for the Morocco national team.

Playing career
Born in Morocco, Kharbouch began playing club football for local side Raja Casablanca. He helped Raja win the 1999 CAF Champions League, and he appeared for the club at the 2000 FIFA Club World Championship in São Paulo. He later played for Hassania US Agadir, FAR Rabat and Difaa El Jadida.

Kharbouch played for Morocco at various youth levels and participated in the 1997 FIFA World Youth Championship in Malaysia and the 2000 Summer Olympics in Sydney. He appeared for the senior Morocco national team in a friendly against Italy on 5 September 2001.

References

External links
 
 
 
 Biography at Sports-reference.com

1977 births
Living people
Moroccan footballers
Association football defenders
Morocco international footballers
Morocco under-20 international footballers
Footballers at the 2000 Summer Olympics
Olympic footballers of Morocco
Raja CA players